Reece Beckles-Richards (born 19 July 1995) is an Antigua and Barbudan international footballer who plays as a striker for Cheshunt. He has also had spells at Aldershot Town, Woking, Kingstonian, Wingate & Finchley and Wealdstone.

Club career
After starting his career with Aldershot Town he spent time on loan at Hastings United. He was released by Aldershot in May 2013 when the club went into administration.

In November, he signed a two-year contract with Woking after impressing on trial. In October 2014 he went on loan to AFC Hornchurch. In November 2014, he joined Farnborough on loan. He returned to Woking after his month's loan but then re-joined Farnborough in late January for a second loan spell. In March 2015, he returned again on loan to AFC Hornchurch.

On 26 September 2015, after only making one appearance for Woking in the 2015/16 campaign, Beckles-Richards joined Kingstonian on a free transfer on a contract until the end of the season. On 12 March 2016, Beckles-Richards scored his first league goal for Kingstonian in a 5–2 victory over Harrow Borough.

In July 2016, Beckles-Richards joined Isthmian League Premier Division rivals Wingate & Finchley on a non-contract deal. On 13 August 2016, on the opening day of the season, Beckles-Richards made his Wingate & Finchley debut in a 3–0 away defeat against Tonbridge Angels, playing the full 90 minutes. On 23 August 2016, Beckles-Richards scored his first Wingate & Finchley goal in a 2–2 draw against AFC Sudbury, netting the opener.

On 23 May 2019, Beckles-Richards agreed to join National League South side, Wealdstone after a three-year spell with Wingate & Finchley. On 13 September 2019, Beckles-Richards joined fellow National League South side, Oxford City on a 30-day loan.  In November he again went out on loan, this time to Cheshunt, with the loan spell due to last until mid-February 2020.

On 26 August 2020, Beckles-Richards joined fellow National League South side, Hemel Hempstead Town following his release from Wealdstone.

International career
Beckles-Richards made his international debut in a 2018 FIFA World Cup qualification match against Saint Lucia on 14 June 2015, where he played the first 65 minutes of the fixture.

Career statistics

References

External links

1995 births
Living people
English footballers
Antigua and Barbuda footballers
Antigua and Barbuda international footballers
Association football forwards
Aldershot Town F.C. players
Farnborough F.C. players
Woking F.C. players
Hornchurch F.C. players
Hastings United F.C. players
Kingstonian F.C. players
Wingate & Finchley F.C. players
Wealdstone F.C. players
Oxford City F.C. players
Cheshunt F.C. players
Hemel Hempstead Town F.C. players
Isthmian League players
National League (English football) players
English sportspeople of Antigua and Barbuda descent